Nomanisan Island and Nomansan Island are puns on the famous quote by John Donne, "No man is an " (Devotions upon Emergent Occasions, 1624). It may refer to:

 Nomanisan Island in Lake Kittamaqundi in Columbia, Maryland, which became a peninsula in 2011
 Nomanisan Island, a fictional place in the 2004 Pixar film The Incredibles and the video game of the same name
 Nomansan Island, a fictional place in the novel The Mysterious Benedict Society and the television series of the same name

See also 
 No man is an island (disambiguation)